Northshore School District is a public school district covering portions of King County and Snohomish County, Washington. The district's service area covers the cities of Bothell, Brier, Woodinville, and Kenmore as well as portions of unincorporated King and Snohomish Counties.

The district is administered by a school board consisting of five members, each serving a district. Dr. Michelle Reid was appointed superintendent in June 2016.

The Northshore School District was formed in February 1959 by the consolidation of the Bothell and Woodinville School Districts.

Elementary schools
Arrowhead Elementary School
Canyon Creek Elementary School
Cottage Lake Elementary School  
Crystal Springs Elementary School 
East Ridge Elementary School 
Fernwood Elementary School 
Frank Love Elementary school
Hollywood Hill Elementary School
Kenmore Elementary school
Kokanee Elementary School
Lockwood Elementary school
Maywood Hills Elementary School
Moorlands Elementary School
Northshore Family Partnership 
Northshore Networks
Ruby Bridges Elementary School 
Shelton View Elementary School
Sorenson Early Childhood Center
Sunrise Elementary School
Wellington Elementary School
Westhill Elementary School
Woodin Elementary School
Woodmoor Elementary School

Middle schools
Canyon Park Middle School
Kenmore Middle School
Leota Middle School
Northshore Family Partnership 
Northshore Middle School
Northshore Networks
Skyview Middle School
Timbercrest Middle School

High schools
Bothell High School
Inglemoor High School
Innovation Lab High School
North Creek High School
Northshore Networks 
Secondary Academy For Success
Woodinville High School

References

External links
 District website
 District scrapbook
 Junior High Schools
 High Schools

School districts in Washington (state)
Education in Bothell, Washington
Education in Snohomish County, Washington
Education in King County, Washington
School districts established in 1959
1959 establishments in Washington (state)